Steven Bernard Hosey (born April 2, 1969) is a small business owner and former right fielder in Major League Baseball.

Originally from Oakland, California Steve has lived in Fresno, California for more than 30 years and is where he has built a successful real estate business.  Steve is also the Director of Parent Engagement and Training for Family Leadership, Inc. and is a leader in his local church.

Steve currently resides in Fresno, California with his wife Deborah and two sons, Deven and Dathan.  Steve's half brother is Boston Celtics basketball player Paul Pierce.

Biography
Steve attended Fremont High School in Oakland and stayed in California attending college at Fresno State University.  At 6 ft 3 in (1.91 m) 218 pounds, Steve was originally drafted by the Cleveland Indians in the 19th round of the 1986 draft.  He chose not to sign with the Indians and was drafted again in the first round of the 1989 draft by the San Francisco Giants, with whom he chose to sign.

Steve has a deep commitment to Fresno because of the profound impact the Fresno community had on him when he was a young baseball player at California State University of Fresno (Fresno State).  Although Steve grew up in East Oakland, in a single parent household, Fresno has been his home for more than 30 years. Even during his professional baseball career, when he played and coached for the San Francisco Giants and the Oakland Athletics, Fresno was always home.  

Steve is a successful business man, real estate broker, and the Director of Parent Engagement and Training for Family Leadership, Inc. In addition, Steve has served as a leader in his church, providing mentorship and guidance to young people for over a decade. His passion to give back to the community and his commitment to developing healthy families throughout Fresno and the Central San Joaquin Valley is reflected in the work he does through Family Leadership. Steve utilizes known methods and innovative strategies to ensure student success, help improve student test scores, all while increasing and sustaining parent engagement.

Steve’s strong and engaging personality, allowed him to become a welcome trainer and effective facilitator for organizations across the country.  He ran for Fresno County Board of Supervisors in District 2, a special election that took place on Tuesday, March 5, 2019. He finished second, in a race of three, getting approximately 32% of the votes.

Political candidate 
Steve Hosey ran to fill the vacancy on the Fresno County Board of Supervisors, District 2 that occurred when former Supervisor Andreas Borgeas ran for and was elected to the California State Senate in District 8. Includes the communities of Fashion Fair, Pinedale, Woodward Park, Fresno State University, Riverpark, Fig Garden, Manchester, and the San Joaquin River in the cities of Fresno and Clovis.

References

External links

 Facebook page: https://www.facebook.com/SteveHoseyforSupervisor
 Twitter: https://twitter.com/Hoseyinc

1969 births
Living people
Major League Baseball right fielders
San Francisco Giants players
Baseball players from San Francisco
African-American baseball players
Baseball players from Oakland, California
Sportspeople from Fresno, California
Fresno State Bulldogs baseball players
Sioux Falls Canaries players
Salinas Peppers players
American political candidates
21st-century African-American people
20th-century African-American sportspeople